Colac Herald is a newspaper servicing Colac, Victoria, Australia,  and surrounding areas. It was first published on 21 December 1868.

History 
The Colac Observer was first printed in 1866; the Colac Herald was printed in 1868 and absorbed the Observer in 1874.

References

External links 
 Colac Herald
 
Digitised World War I Victorian newspapers from the State Library of Victoria

Publications established in 1868
1868 establishments in Australia
Newspapers published in Victoria (Australia)
Colac, Victoria